John Elliot Sanford (November 22, 1830 – October 11, 1907) was a U.S. politician who served as the ninth Insurance Commissioner of Massachusetts from June 29, 1866, to November 1, 1869; as Chairman of the Massachusetts Board of Railroad Commissioners; and, from 1872 to 1875, as the Speaker of the Massachusetts House of Representatives.

See also
 93rd Massachusetts General Court (1872)
 94th Massachusetts General Court (1873)
 95th Massachusetts General Court (1874)
 96th Massachusetts General Court (1875)

Footnotes

 

1907 deaths
Republican Party members of the Massachusetts House of Representatives
Speakers of the Massachusetts House of Representatives
Politicians from Taunton, Massachusetts
Amherst College alumni
1830 births
19th-century American politicians

External Links 

 John Elliot Sanford (AC 1851) Correspondence Collection at the Amherst College Archives & Special Collections